Hussainiwala is a village near Firozpur city in Firozpur district in Punjab state, India. It lies near the bank of the Sutlej river. The village is on the border with Pakistan, opposite the Pakistani village of Ganda Singh Wala. It is a border crossing between India and Pakistan that is currently closed, however a daily joint beating retreat border ceremony is held by the two nations.

It is 10km northwest of district headquarters Firozpur, 100km south of Amritsar, 135km west of Ludhiana, 120km northwest of Bathinda, 235km west of state capital Chandigarh, 265km northwest from Hisar, and 400km northwest from Delhi.

Etymology 
The village is named after the Muslim Peer Ghulam Hussainiwala (Saint Hussaini wala, or Saint "who is of Husain"), whose tomb is in the Border Security Force (BSF) compound at Hussainiwala. The village was acquired from Pakistan and in exchange India gave 12 of its villages to Pakistan after the partition of India.

Across the border, the Ganda Singh Wala village was named after a Sikh soldier of British Indian Army, Ganda Singh Datt.

This village(Hussainiwala) was named after Hussaini Brahmin who are the second branch of Mohyal Brahmin .

History

Indo-Pakistan War of 1965 
At the outbreak of the Indo-Pakistani War of 1965, the 2nd Maratha Light Infantry (also called the Kali Panchwin) was based in Mathura when it deployed a small unit to Hussainiwala in the Firozpur sector of Punjab. During the war, the Kali Panchwin defended Hussainiwala Headworks in Ferozepur sector. It defended the headworks against an attack by a full infantry brigade supported by armoured columns of the Pakistan Army. The tower on the other side of the river was captured and razed to ground. The battalion launched an attack on the forward two companies supported by tanks, using heavy artillery fire and air support. The Pakistan Army was stalled by the artillery fire, their attack broke up, and they retreated. The Kali Panchwin's commanding officer and battery commander were killed by artillery shelling the next morning while supervising operations. The battalion was awarded the battle honour "Hussainiwala" for its role in the 1965 war, its first post-independence battle honour.

Indo-Pakistan War of 1971 

Hussainiwala was captured by Pakistan during the Indo-Pakistani War of 1971. On 3 December, at 18:35, units from Pakistan's 106th infantry brigade launched an attack on the village, which was defended by the 15th Punjab Battalion (formerly First Patiala). By the night of 4th December, the 15th Punjab had completely withdrawn from the area, which subsequently fell to Pakistan.

Major Kanwaljit Sandhu, an Indian commander, was badly injured, and Major SPS Waraich was reported captured, as were many Junior Commissioned Officers and men as the squadrons were taken by surprise and had little time to get to their bunkers. A Pakistani radio news telecast reported (in Urdu) that "Maj Waraich hamari hiraasat mein hain" ("Maj Waraich is in our custody"). There was a subsequent report that Major Waraich was in a North West Frontier jail. Their current status is unknown. They are listed as missing by the Indian Government along with 52 others, including Major Ashok Suri who wrote a letter to his father in 1975 from Karachi stating that he was alive and well. Pakistan denies holding any of the soldiers who are missing in action.

India–Pakistan border crossing 

The border crossing, 10km from district headquarters Ferozepur, has a ruined fort, National Martyrs Memorial and a daily beating retreat flag ceremony, all three in the same compound manned by India's Border Security Forces.

India–Pakistan border crossing 

The border crossing is now closed for travellers, although a flag retreat ceremony is still held daily. Until 1970, it was the principal road crossing between India and Pakistan, and was a trade route for truckers, mostly for the import of Kandahari Angoor (dehydrated grapes) and other fruits and food products from Pakistan and Afghanistan. The border crossing was replaced by the border crossing at Attari, a little further north. In 2005 there were proposals to reopen the border, but it remained closed. Hussainiwala Headworks is located at this village across the Sutlej river which supplies irrigation water to Bikaner canal and Eastern canal.

Hussainiwala-Ganda Singh Wala border ceremony 

At the Hussainiwala–Ganda Singh Wala border crossing, a flag beating retreat ceremony has been held every day at 6 pm since 1970 by the military of both nations. It is open to the public and tourists as a tourist attraction. It is similar to the Mahavir/Sadaki near Fazilka and Wagah–Atari border ceremony, though attendees are mostly local Punjabis from either side of the border. As a result, the atmosphere is not as tense as some other border ceremonies, and Indian and Pakistani attendees often smile and wave to one another, and even cheer for each other's guards as they perform the ceremony. At one point during the ceremony, an Indian BSF soldier and a Pakistani Ranger cross over the borderline to collect the flags of their respective nations.

The National Martyrs Memorial 

Hussainniwala is the site of the National Martyrs Memorial, which marks the location where Bhagat Singh, Sukhdev and Rajguru were cremated on 23 March 1931. It is also the cremation place of Batukeshwar Dutt, who was also involved in bombing the Central Legislative Assembly with Singh, and that of Singh's mother, Vidyawati. After the Partition of India, the cremation spot became a part of Pakistan but on 17 January 1961 it was returned to India in exchange for 12 villages near the Sulemanki Headworks (Fazilka).

An annual fair takes place at the memorial on 23 March, which is the anniversary of Singh's death. The day is also observed across the state of Punjab.

Gallery

See also
 Attari
 Munabao

References 

Cities and towns in Firozpur district
India–Pakistan border crossings